Blane Comstock (born November 3, 1949) is an American ice hockey player. He competed in the men's tournament at the 1976 Winter Olympics.

References

External links
 

1949 births
Living people
American men's ice hockey players
Bemidji State Beavers men's ice hockey players
Olympic ice hockey players of the United States
Ice hockey players at the 1976 Winter Olympics
People from Roseau, Minnesota
Warroad Lakers players